Lali Chichinadze is a Georgian former footballer who played as a defender. She has officially played for the senior Georgia women's national team.

International career
Chichinadze capped for Georgia at senior level during the UEFA Women's Euro 2009 qualifying.

References

Living people
Women's association football defenders
Women's footballers from Georgia (country)
Georgia (country) women's international footballers
Year of birth missing (living people)